Isla Islitas, is an island in the Gulf of California east of the Baja California Peninsula. The island is uninhabited and is part of the Loreto Municipality.

Biology
Isla Islitas has only one species of  reptile, Urosaurus nigricauda (black-tailed brush lizard).

References

Islands of the Gulf of California
Islands of Baja California Sur
Loreto Municipality (Baja California Sur)
Uninhabited islands of Mexico